The men's road race at the 1993 UCI Road World Championships was the 60th edition of the event. The race took place on Sunday 29 August 1993 in Oslo, Norway. The race was won by Lance Armstrong of the United States.

Final classification

References

Men's Road Race
UCI Road World Championships – Men's road race